Yedthare is a locality in Byndoor Town. It is a part of Byndoor Town Panchayat. India. It is located in the Byndoor taluk of Udupi district in Karnataka.

Demographics
As of 2001 India census, Yedthare had a population of 9170 with 4391 males and 4779 females.

See also
 Byndoor
 Paduvari
 Taggarse
 Districts of Karnataka

References

External links
 http://Udupi.nic.in/

Cities and towns in Udupi district